La niña de la mina is a Mexican horror movie directed by Jorge Eduardo Ramirez and starring Regina Blandon, Gerardo Taracena and José Ángel Bichir.

Synopsis
After a tourist disappears inside a mine in Guanajuato, Mat Medina a young expert in mine engineering is hired to make a security diagnostic in the mines of a big company.

Production
The movie was filmed in the mines "El nopal", "San Vicente" and "Peñafiel", in the Villa Marín Cristina Hotel and in the Historic Center of Guanajuato. In the city of León was filmed in the San Juan plaza, in the Madero street, and in the Center Medical School. In the Mexico City was filmed at a university. The shooting of the film lasted 6 weeks and after worked in the postproduction.

Cast
 José Ángel Bichir as Mateo Medina.
 Regina Blandon as Sara Sanromán.
 Gerardo Taracena as Carlos.
 Eugenio Bartilotti as Jaime.
 Ruy Senderos as Ricardo "Ricky".
 Victor Huggo Martín as Hamilton.
 Paola Galina as Karen.
 Bárbara Islas as Pamela.
 Andrea Verdeja as Ana.
 Fernanda Sasse as Niña.
 Daniel Martinez as Kaplan.
 Álvaro Sagone as Forense.

References

External links
 https://www.imdb.com/title/tt3995766/?ref_=ttco_co_tt
 http://www.filmaffinity.com/mx/film859539.html
 https://web.archive.org/web/20160813182713/http://zonafranca.mx/la-nina-de-la-mina/
 http://www.ecartelera.com.mx/peliculas/la-nina-de-la-mina/
 https://web.archive.org/web/20160624204441/http://boomgers.com/2016/18715
 http://www.zumpango.net/te-invitamos-la-premier-la-nina-la-mina/
 https://web.archive.org/web/20160706094541/http://www.videocine.com.mx/la-nina-de-la-mina/
 http://www.radioformula.com.mx/notas.asp?Idn=605332&idFC=2016
 http://www.debate.com.mx/show/-La-nina-de-la-mina-te-causara-horror-el-fin-de-semana-20160627-0219.html

2016 films
Mexican horror films